Reverend Gary Davis, also Blind Gary Davis (born Gary D. Davis, April 30, 1896 – May 5, 1972), was a blues and gospel singer who was also proficient on the banjo, guitar and harmonica. Born in Laurens, South Carolina and blind since infancy, Davis first performed professionally in the Piedmont blues scene of Durham, North Carolina in the 1930s, then converted to Christianity and became a minister. After moving to New York in the 1940s, Davis experienced a career rebirth as part of the American folk music revival that peaked during the 1960s. Davis' most notable recordings include "Samson and Delilah" and "Death Don't Have No Mercy".

Davis' fingerpicking guitar style influenced many other artists. His students included Stefan Grossman, David Bromberg, Steve Katz, Roy Book Binder, Larry Johnson, Nick Katzman, Dave Van Ronk, Rory Block, Ernie Hawkins, Larry Campbell, Bob Weir, Woody Mann, and Tom Winslow. He also influenced Bob Dylan, the Grateful Dead, Wizz Jones, Jorma Kaukonen, Keb' Mo', Ollabelle, Resurrection Band, and John Sebastian (of the Lovin' Spoonful).

Biography
Davis was born in Laurens, South Carolina in the Piedmont region. Of the eight children his mother bore, he was one of two who survived to adulthood. He became blind as an infant. He recalled being poorly treated by his mother and that his father placed him in the care of his paternal grandmother. Davis reported that when he was 10 years old, his father was killed in Birmingham, Alabama. He later said he had been told that his father was shot by the Birmingham sheriff.

He sang for the first time at Gray Court's Baptist church in South Carolina. He took to the guitar and assumed a unique multivoice style produced solely with his thumb and index finger, playing gospel, ragtime, and blues tunes along with traditional and original tunes in four-part harmony.

In the mid-1920s, Davis moved to Durham, North Carolina, a major center of black culture at the time. There he taught Blind Boy Fuller and collaborated with a number of other artists in the Piedmont blues scene, including Bull City Red. In 1935, J. B. Long, a store manager with a reputation for supporting local artists, introduced Davis, Fuller, and Red to the American Record Company. The recording sessions (available on his Complete Early Recordings) marked the beginning of Davis's career. He became a Christian, and ordained as a Baptist minister in Washington, North Carolina, in 1933. Following his conversion and after his ordination, Davis began to prefer inspirational gospel music.

In the 1940s, the blues scene in Durham began to decline, and Davis moved to New York. In 1951, he recorded an oral history for the folklorist Elizabeth Lyttleton Harold (the wife of Alan Lomax). who transcribed their conversations in a typescript more than 300 pages long.

The folk revival of the 1960s invigorated Davis's career, and he performed at the Newport Folk Festival in 1965. Eleven songs from those performances were released on the 1967 album At Newport. In March 1969, Davis' former student and driver, John Townley, who had since established Apostolic Recording Studio, persuaded Davis to his first recording studio session in five years. The resulting album, O, Glory – The Apostolic Studio Sessions would be Davis' final studio album, released posthumously in 1973.

Peter, Paul and Mary recorded Davis' version of "Samson and Delilah", also known as "If I Had My Way", a song by Blind Willie Johnson, which Davis had popularized. Although the song was in the public domain, it was copyrighted as having been written by Gary Davis at the time of the recording by Peter, Paul and Mary. The resulting royalties allowed Davis to buy a house and live comfortably for the rest of his life, and Davis referred to the house as "the house that Peter, Paul and Mary built." The Grateful Dead covered "Samson and Delilah" on their album Terrapin Station and credited it to Davis. They covered Davis' song "Death Don't Have No Mercy". Eric Von Schmidt credited Davis with three-quarters of Schmidt's "Baby, Let Me Follow You Down", which Bob Dylan covered on his debut album for Columbia Records. The Blues Hall of Fame singer and harmonica player Darrell Mansfield has recorded several of Davis's songs. The Rolling Stones credited Davis and Mississippi Fred McDowell for "You Gotta Move" on their 1971 album Sticky Fingers.

Davis died of a heart attack in May 1972 in Hammonton, New Jersey. He is buried in plot 68 of Rockville Cemetery in Lynbrook, New York.

Discography
Many of Davis' recordings were published posthumously.

Posthumous recognition 
Reverend Gary Davis was recognized alongside Blind Boy Fuller as Main Honorees by the Sesquicentennial Honors Commission at the Durham 150 Closing Ceremony in Durham, North Carolina, on November 2, 2019. The posthumous recognition was bestowed upon them for their contributions to the Piedmont blues.

See also
 "Cocaine Blues"
 Gospel blues

References

Further reading
 Mann, Woody (2003). The Art of Acoustic Blues Guitar: Ragtime and Gospel. Oak Publications.
 Reevy, Tony; Weaver, Caroline (July 2002). "Street Sessions, Piedmont Style". Our State.
 Stambler, Irwin; Stambler, Lyndon (2001). Folk and Blues, the Encyclopedia. New York: St. Martin's Press.
 Tilling, Robert (1992). Oh, What a Beautiful City! A Tribute to Rev. Gary Davis. Paul Mill Press. .
 von Schmidt, Eric (2008). "Remembering Reverend Gary Davis". Sing Out! 51(4)67–73.
 Zack, Ian (2015). Say No to the Devil: The Life and Musical Genius of Rev. Gary Davis. University of Chicago Press. .

External links
 RevGaryDavis.com, a site devoted to Gary Davis.
 Harlem Street Singer, 2013 documentary film on the life and music of Reverend Gary Davis
 www.folkways.si.edu, Smithsonian Folkways recordings information.
 
 [ Davis biography on AllMusic.com]
 Biography of the Reverend Gary Davis from the Association of Cultural Equity
 The guitar students of Rev. Gary Davis with links to performances
The Rev. Gary Davis performing on WNYC Radio, February 10, 1966.

1896 births
1972 deaths
20th-century American composers
African-American guitarists
American blues guitarists
American male guitarists
American blues singers
American street performers
American gospel singers
American harmonica players
Blind musicians
Country blues musicians
East Coast blues musicians
Fingerstyle guitarists
Gospel blues musicians
Guitarists from South Carolina
Piedmont blues musicians
People from Laurens, South Carolina
Ragtime composers
20th-century American guitarists
20th-century African-American male singers
20th-century Baptist ministers from the United States